The Life and Labor Commune was a Tolstoyan agricultural commune founded in 1921 and disbanded as a state run collective farm on January 1, 1939. The commune was founded near Moscow but was later resettled in central Siberia, not far from Novokuznetsk. At its peak, it reportedly had as many as 1,000 participants. Throughout its existence the members of the commune were persecuted by the Bolsheviks, both for refusing to enlist or support their war efforts as well as for organizing themselves communally outside of the approved state structure.

Founding (1921–1930) 
The Life and Labor Commune was founded on December 31, 1921 with a rental contract with the Moscow District Land Department for the Shestakóvka estate, twelve miles outside of Moscow. The commune was built on land in the Tsarítsyn district of the Moscow region and fell under the village soviet of Troparyovo. The commune was named "Life and Labor" after the Tolstoyan and anarchist leanings of its founding members. From the very beginning, all communal meals were strictly vegetarian.

In 1927 the commune began to come under attack along with the Tolstoy New Jerusalem Commune, which was liquidated by the Soviet government in 1929. Many of the members from there joined the Life and Labor Commune. Leading members of the commune came under legal prosecution by the government, which attempted to revoke their charter. They were defended in court by anarchist Peter Kropotkin, a member of the Public Defender's Office, as well as nephew of Kropotkin.

Resettlement (1931) 
Vladimir Cherkov, who intervened on behalf of conscientious objectors to the Red Army with Lenin and had won them their freedom from impressment, suggested that the Life and Labor Commune resettle along with other followers of Tolstoy to form one large commune. On February 28, 1930 the All-Russian Central Executive Committee issued a decree by the Presidium of the Committee, Protocol 41, Paragraph 5, about "the resettlement of Tolstoyan communes and cooperatives." After a scouting expedition in the spring of 1930, the location of Kuznetsk along the Tom River was chosen. On March 22, 1931, after selling the livestock and donating the farm to an outpatient psychiatric hospital, the inhabitants of the Life and Labor Commune set out for outskirts of Siberia.

Demise under Stalinism (1936–1939) 
In 1936, the leaders of the commune were arrested, followed by additional waves of arrests in 1937 and 1938. By January 1939, the few remaining women and children were consolidated into a Soviet collective farm. Many of the communards died in labor camps or were executed for refusing to serve in the military.

Aleksandr Solzhenitsyn wrote about the persecution of the commune:

Memoirs of participants 
Several of the participants in the commune wrote memoirs of their experiences.

See also
 Christian anarchism
 Tolstoyans
 List of anarchist communities
 Utopian socialism
 Anarchism in Russia

References
Memoirs Of Peasant Tolstoyans In Soviet Russia, William Edgerton; Indiana University Press, 1993

Anarchism in Russia
Anarchism in the Soviet Union
Anarchist intentional communities
Christian anarchism
Christian pacifism
Christian philosophy
Political repression in the Soviet Union
Populated places disestablished in 1939
Populated places established in 1921
Tolstoyan movement
Vegetarian communities